Oghlan Tappeh (also Romanized as Oghlān Tappeh, Owghlān Tappeh, and Uqlān Tepe) is a village in Oghlan Tappeh Rural District of Ramjin District, Chaharbagh County, Alborz province, Iran. At the 2006 census, its population was 1,480 in 369 households, at which time it was in Ramjin Rural District of Savojbolagh County, Tehran province. At the latest census in 2016, the village had a population of 2,085 in 635 households, by which time Savojbolagh County had become a part of the newly established Alborz province.

References 

Populated places in Alborz Province